Shaheed Dweep, is an island of the Andaman Islands, located in Ritchie's Archipelago. It belongs to the South Andaman administrative district, part of the Indian union territory of Andaman and Nicobar Islands.

Etymology
Neill Island was named after British Brigadier general James Neill, who had fought on the side of the British East Indian company in the Sepoy Mutiny of 1857.

In December 2018, it was renamed as Shaheed Dweep as a tribute to Netaji Subhas Chandra Bose. Bose had hoisted the Indian flag at Port Blair on 30 December 1943 and proclaimed the Andaman and Nicobar Islands as territories liberated form British rule. He had subsequently named Andaman Island as Shaheed and Nicobar Island as Swaraj.

History
Shaheed Dweep, then Neill Island, was uninhabited until the arrival of settlers in the late 1960s. Like Swaraj Dweep, then Havelock, the vast majority of settlers at Shaheed Dweep were refugees from erstwhile East-Pakistan, following the exodus of Hindu Bangladeshis prior to that country's war of independence in 1971.

On 30 December 2018, Prime Minister Narendra Modi announced that Neill Island would be renamed as Shaheed Dweep.

Geography
The island belongs to the Ritchie's Archipelago and is located between Havelock Island and Rose Island.
It is a comparatively flat island, and much of the landmass was deemed suitable for paddy cultivation. Unfortunately, as a result of this, very little forest cover remains at Shaheed, and almost all of it is concentrated in the reserve forest on Shaheed's north-western side.
Shaheed Dweep tends to remain a degree or two warmer than Havelock as a result of the lack of forest cover.  The island is not without charm however, but it is a different, pastoral sort of charm that the island offers.

Administration
Politically, Shaheed Dweep is part of Neill Kendra panchayat, of Port Blair Taluk.

Demographics 
The population of 3040 lives in five villages, listed below, with population at 2011 census in parentheses:
 Sitapur (274)
 Bharatpur (629)
 Neill Kendra (1000)
 Lakshmanpur (382)
 Ram Nagar (755)

Transport
There is a jetty at Neill Kendra, which serves as the only access point of the island.
There are regular Government ferry from Port Blair to Shaheed Dweep.
There are private cruise ships such as Makruzz, Green Ocean, Sea Link and Coastal Cruise.

Economy
Agriculture is the primary occupation of the villagers, and the island supplies vegetables to the rest of Andaman. Neil island is known for it organic cultivation and provides much of the organic produce to remaining part of the islands.

Tourism
Despite its minuscule tourist infrastructure, an increasing number of tourists have chosen to stay at Shaheed Dweep instead of neighboring Swaraj Dweep. There are a handful of restaurants and basic beach hotels that cater to international and domestic tourists.

Some notable places to visit in Neil Island are, Bharatpur Beach, Laxmanpur Beach, Sitapur Beach, and Natural Bridge. Some people also like to visit the Ramnagar Beach, also known as the Sunset Beach. Water Sports Activities are only available in Bharatpur Beach. Rest of the attractions are only for sightseeing.

Shaheed Dweep can be explored by renting a two-wheeler, cycle or by hiring private cabs. Currently, no self drive vehicles are available at Shaheed Dweep. Activities such as boat scuba diving, snorkelling, glass bottom boat rides are available at Shaheed Dweep. Limited ferry are available from Port Blair to Shaheed Dweep. It is recommended to reach Swaraj Dweep before coming to Shaheed Dweep for better connectivity.

Image gallery

References

External links

Neill Island brochure at Andaman Tourism

Ritchie's Archipelago
Islands of South Andaman district
Islands of the Andaman Sea
Islands of India
Populated places in India
Islands of the Bay of Bengal